Oiartzun Kirol Elkartea is a Spanish football club from Oiartzun, Gipuzkoa, founded in 1975. It is best known for its women's section, established in 1981.

History
Oiartzun was one of the leading teams in the first years of organized women's football in Spain, winning the national championship in 1987 and 1988 and the national league in 1991. However, in 1993 the team was relegated for financial reasons to the second tier, which became four years later the top category as the División de Honor was disbanded. Meanwhile, Oiartzun reached the semifinals of the Copa de la Reina in 1996 and 1997.

When RFEF launched the Superliga Femenina in 2001 Oiartzun was registered in second tier Primera Nacional. Oiartzun has played the promotion play-offs in four occasions but it was defeated by FC Barcelona in 2004, UD Collerense in 2009, SD Reocín in 2010 and Sevilla FC in 2012. Oiartzun finally returned to the top tier Primera División for the 2015–2016 season, but was relegated again at the end of the 2016–17 Primera División season. Its traditional rival is Añorga KKE.

Season to season

Honours
Campeonato Nacional
 1987, 1988
Liga Nacional
 1991

Former internationals
  Eli Artola
  María Ángeles Gil
  Ana Ruiz

References

External links
Oiartzun at Txapeldunak

Women's football clubs in Spain
Association football clubs established in 1975
Football clubs in the Basque Country (autonomous community)
1975 establishments in Spain